Dane Whitehouse (born 14 October 1970) is an English former footballer who played in the Football League for Sheffield United. Whitehouse was an accomplished left winger, who was equally comfortable filling in at left back. He served his only club, Sheffield United, for 13 years between 1987 and 2000, making 278 appearances and scoring 51 goals in all competitions.

Club career
Whitehouse signed professionally for Sheffield United in July 1987 and made his first team debut against Blackpool in 1988, aged just 18. He made a good early impression, but was in and out of the team for most of his early professional career. He played a part in the Blades' promotion from the old Third Division in 1988, and again in the next season when United were promoted to the top flight. He began to establish himself as a first-team regular during the 1991–92 season. His goals included a double against Chelsea in a 2–1 win, and he also chipped in with three FA Cup goals.

In the first Steel City derby of the 1991–92 campaign, Whitehouse scored against local rivals Sheffield Wednesday in a 2–0 win at Bramall Lane. In the return fixture at Hillsborough, he was once again on target, scoring the first goal.

After a game against Bristol City, Whitehouse broke his leg and missed a large proportion of the 1992–93 season. Despite the seriousness of the injury, he returned to play a part towards the end of the campaign. He starred in the closing stages of the Blades' run to the FA Cup semi-final, making an appearance at Wembley Stadium in the defeat to Sheffield Wednesday. He was also on the scoresheet twice in the final game of the season, when United hammered Chelsea 4–2.

Despite an opening day win over Swindon Town the next season, United were again struggling to keep their Premier League status intact. In a 3–2 home win over West Ham United, Whitehouse smashed the ball into the top corner from nearly 30 yards for what was one of the goals of the season. Despite Whitehouse's goals, United were relegated on the final game of the season, losing 3–2 away at Chelsea.

Whitehouse was again in good scoring form at the start of the 1994–95 season. He eventually finished with 10 goals in all competitions, which included a hat-trick in the League Cup against Stockport County, but the Blades failed to win promotion.

After a disappointing 1995–96 season United parted with longtime manager Dave Bassett. Howard Kendall took charge and, despite a clear out of players, Whitehouse was still a first-team regular in the new regime. He finished with six goals in the 1995–96 season, which included a goal against Arsenal at Highbury in the FA Cup. During the 1997–98 campaign, Whitehouse was a regular up to November. In a game against Port Vale he was crudely tackled by Gareth Ainsworth, and Whitehouse suffered a serious knee injury. Despite an attempt to get back to fitness, which included a few outings for the reserves, Whitehouse was forced to retire.

Career statistics

References

1970 births
Living people
Sheffield United F.C. players
Footballers from Sheffield
English footballers
Association football fullbacks
Association football wingers
Premier League players